Aymaraes Province is the largest of seven provinces of the Apurímac Region in Peru. The capital of the province is the city of Chalhuanca. The province was founded by General Simón Bolívar on June 21, 1824.

Boundaries
North: Andahuaylas Province, Abancay Province
East: Abancay Province, Antabamba Province
South: Ayacucho Region
West: Ayacucho Region, Andahuaylas Province

Geography 
Other mountains are listed below:

Political division
The province measures  and is divided into seventeen districts:

Ethnic groups 
The people in the province are mainly indigenous citizens of Quechua descent. Quechua is the language which the majority of the population (71.05%) learnt to speak in childhood, 28.61% of the residents started speaking using the Spanish language and  0.15 	% using Aymara  (2007 Peru Census).

References

External links
  Official website of the aymaraes Province

Provinces of the Apurímac Region